Kushk-e Sofla (also Romanized as Kūshk-e Soflá; also known as Keveshk-e Pā’īn, Keveshk Pā’īn, Kūshk, and Kūshk-e Pā’īn) is a village in Rostam-e Yek Rural District, in the Central District of Rostam County, Fars Province, Iran. At the 2006 census, its population was 50, in 11 families.

References 

Populated places in Rostam County